Rescue: Special Ops is an Australian television drama series that first screened on the Nine Network in 2009. Filmed in and around Sydney, the program is produced by Southern Star Group with the assistance of Screen Australia and the New South Wales Government.

The series focuses on a team of experienced professional paramedics who specialise in rescue operations. It premiered on Sunday 2 August 2009, and the season finale of the first season aired on Sunday 25 October. A second season screened from 28 June 2010. The third and final season consisting of 22 episodes screened from 30 May 2011. The Nine Network has confirmed it will not be renewing Rescue: Special Ops for a fourth season.

Synopsis
Rescue: Special Ops follows the work of a team of experienced paramedics involved in complex search and rescue operations.

The job brings them face to face with life and death situations every day but just like anyone else, they juggle life, love and career. Brothers Dean Gallagher and Chase Gallagher are competitive alpha males who are part of the Special Ops team.

Cast and characters

Regular cast
 Libby Tanner as Michelle LeTourneau (Station Manager)
 Peter Phelps as Vince Marchello (Station Coordinator)
 Les Hill as Dean Gallagher (Unit Leader)
 Gigi Edgley as Lara Knight (Unit Officer)
 Daniel Amalm as Jordan Zwitkowski (Unit Officer)
 Katherine Hicks as Heidi Wilson (Unit Officer)
 Andrew Lees as Chase Gallagher (Unit Officer)
 Luke McKenzie as Lachie Gallagher (Unit Officer) (Season 3)

Recurring cast
 Wil Traval as Hamish McIntyre
 Tim McCunn as Ian Johnson
 Jessica Napier as Nicole (Season 1)
 Simmone Jade Mackinnon as Fiona Charlton (Season 1)
 Gary Sweet as Shane Gallagher (Season 1)
 Martin Dingle-Wall as Jake Hudson (Season 1)
 Luke Pegler as Bingo (Season 2)
 Vanessa Gray as Renae Daltry (Season 2)
 Todd Lasance as Cam (Season 3)

Reception

Series one

Series two

Series three

 Note: Nightly rank for episodes 1 and 2, and 20 and 21 are combined.

Home Media
The Universal Studios DVD Releases of Rescue Special Ops are now out of print and no longer available. Via Vision Entertainment/Madman Entertainment will release "Rescue Special Ops: The Complete Collection" on 26 August 2020.

See also
 List of Australian television series

Notes

References

External links
 Rescue: Special Ops at the Australian Television Information Archive
 
 Nine Network – Cast of Rescue: Special Ops

Nine Network original programming
Australian drama television series
2009 Australian television series debuts
2011 Australian television series endings
Television shows set in Sydney
Australian medical television series
Television series by Endemol Australia